Oltacloea is a genus of South American ground spiders that was first described by Cândido Firmino de Mello-Leitão in 1940.  it contains only three species, found only in Argentina and Brazil: O. beltraoae, O. mutilata, and O. ribaslangei. Originally placed with the long-spinneret ground spiders, it was transferred to the ground spiders in 2018.

See also
 List of Gnaphosidae species

References

Araneomorphae genera
Gnaphosidae
Spiders of Argentina
Spiders of Brazil
Taxa named by Cândido Firmino de Mello-Leitão